Anaphase-promoting complex subunit 11 is an enzyme that in humans is encoded by the ANAPC11 gene.

Interactions
ANAPC11 has been shown to interact with ANAPC2 and CDC27.

References

External links

Further reading